Simrry Darissa Villarreyna Zelaya (born 17 November 1994) is a Nicaraguan footballer who plays as a forward for Real Estelí FC and the Nicaragua women's national team.

Early life
Villareyna was born in Ocotal and raised in Quilalí.

Club career
Villareyna has played for FC Ocotal and Real Estelí in Nicaragua.

International career
Villareyna made her senior debut for Nicaragua on 4 July 2021 in a 0–2 friendly away loss to Panama.

References

External links

1994 births
Living people
People from Nueva Segovia Department
Nicaraguan women's footballers
Women's association football forwards
Nicaragua women's international footballers